Kalhara Senarathne (born 24 August 2000) is a Sri Lankan cricketer. He made his first-class debut for Ragama Cricket Club in the 2018–19 Premier League Tournament on 14 December 2018. He made his Twenty20 debut on 9 March 2021, for Ragama Cricket Club in the 2020–21 SLC Twenty20 Tournament. He made his List A debut on 24 March 2021, for Ragama Cricket Club in the 2020–21 Major Clubs Limited Over Tournament. In November 2021, he was selected to play for the Kandy Warriors following the players' draft for the 2021 Lanka Premier League.

References

External links
 

2000 births
Living people
Sri Lankan cricketers
Ragama Cricket Club cricketers
Place of birth missing (living people)